Highly Flavoured is the debut studio album by South African singer, poet and songwriter Busiswa. It was released on 8 December 2017 through Kalawa Jazmee. The album features guest appearances by artists DJ Maphorisa, Busi N, DJ Athie, Da Fre, DJ Toxic, Nokwazi, Moozlie, Lando and Yasirah. Primarily, Highly Flavoured is a gqom album.

The album received positive reviews from music critics. It was certified gold by the Recording Industry of South Africa (RiSA). It produced one single — "Bazoyenza".

Critical reception

Release and promotion
In August 2017, Gqulu announced that her debut  album will be entitled Highly Flavored. Throughout the remainder of 2017, Gqulu featured on several singles, including Tipcee's "Isichathulo" and DJ Maphorisa's "Vuvushka" and "Midnight Starring".
"Bazoyenza" was released as the lead single off Highly Flavored.

Accolades

Track listing

Certifications

Personnel 
Credits all adapted  from AllMusic.

 Da Fresh - Featured Artist
 DJ Athie - Featured Artist
 DJ Maphorisa - Featured Artist
 Busiswa Gqulu - Primary Artist, Composer
 Rabelani Madula - Composer
 Nqobile Mahlangu - Composer
 Mihlali Mali - Composer
 Athanathi Mbilini - Composer
 Joyous Buthelezi Mdlongwa - Composer
 Moozlie - Featured Artist
 Tshepo William Mpinga - Composer
 Busi N - Featured Artist
 Busisiwe Ngwenya - Composer
 Nokwazi - Featured Artist
 Themba Sekowe - Composer
 Akona Sitani - Composer
 Sibusiso Sonti - Composer
 Thabo Tshepe - Composer
 Lando - Featured Artist
 Yasirah - Featured Artist

Release history

References

2017 debut albums
Albums by South African artists
Gqom albums
Kalawa Jazmee Records albums
Albums produced by DJ Maphorisa